Cinnamon Lake is a census-designated place (CDP) within Jackson Township, Ashland County, Ohio, United States. The population was 1,243 at the 2010 census. It consists of a planned community surrounding a  reservoir also named Cinnamon Lake.

Geography
Muddy Fork, the outlet of Cinnamon Lake, flows east, then south, to the Lake Fork Mohican River, then to the Mohican River and into the Walhonding River and finally the Muskingum River, a tributary of the Ohio River.

No numbered highways run through the CDP.

Demographics

References

Census-designated places in Ashland County, Ohio
Census-designated places in Ohio